Kirkovo is a village in Kardzhali Province, southern Bulgaria, near the Greek border.

External links
Kirkovo municipality

Villages in Kardzhali Province